In photography, the shutter-release button (sometimes just shutter release or shutter button) is a push-button found on many cameras, used to record photographs. When pressed, the shutter of the camera is "released", so that it opens to capture a picture, and then closes, allowing an exposure time as determined by the shutter speed setting (which may be automatic).  Some cameras also utilize an electronic shutter, as opposed to a mechanical shutter. 

The shutter-release button is one of the most basic features of a dedicated handheld camera. Mobile devices such as modern smartphones have a touchscreen button for capturing photos, but also have a physical shutter button as well, as the sound volume buttons are used as such. 

The term "release" comes from old mechanical shutters that were "cocked" or "tensioned" by one lever, and then "released" by another.  In modern or digital photography, this notion is less meaningful, so the term "shutter button" or simply "capture button" is more used.

See also
 Remote shutter
 Selfie stick
 Bulb (photography)

References

Camera features